Music Is Magic is a 1935 Fox musical film directed by George Marshall. The movie stars Alice Faye and Bebe Daniels and is based on a play by Jesse Lasky Jr. and Gladys Unger. The movie was Daniels' last American screen appearance.

Plot
Diane De Valle (Bebe Daniels) is an aging theatre actress who can't deal with getting older. Trying to hide it, she has to come to terms she is being replaced by a younger actress. She has to defeat the much younger Peggy Harper (Alice Faye) for a role of a young woman in an upcoming stage production.

Cast
 Alice Faye – Peggy Harper
 Bebe Daniels – Diane De Valle
 Ray Walker – Jack Lambert
 Frank Mitchell – Peanuts Harper
 Jack Durant – Eddie Harper
 Rosina Lawrence – Shirley De Valle
 Thomas Beck – Tony Bennett
 Hattie McDaniel – Amanda
 Arline Judge _ Theatre Customer (uncredited)

Soundtrack
 Honey Chile
 by Oscar Levant and Sydney Clare
 Sung by Alice Faye
 Love is Smiling at Me
 by Oscar Levant and Sydney Clare
 Sung by Alice Faye
 Music Is Magic
 by Arthur Johnston and Sydney Clare
 Sung by Alice Faye
 La Locumba
 by Raoul Julien and Sydney Clare
 Sung by Alice Faye

References

External links
 
 
 

1935 films
Films directed by George Marshall
20th Century Fox films
American black-and-white films
1935 musical films
Fox Film films
American musical films
1930s English-language films
1930s American films